The 1992–93 Northeast Louisiana Indians men's basketball team represented the Northeast Louisiana University in the 1992–93 NCAA Division I men's basketball season. The Indians, led by head coach Mike Vining, played their home games at Fant–Ewing Coliseum in Monroe, Louisiana, as members of the Southland Conference. They finished the season 26–5, 17–1 in Southland play to win the regular season league title. They followed the regular season by winning the Southland tournament to earn an automatic bid to the NCAA tournament as No. 13 seed in the Southeast region. Northeast Louisiana fell to No. 4 seed Iowa in the opening round, 82–69.

Roster

Schedule and results

|-
!colspan=9 style=| Regular season

|-
!colspan=9 style=| Southland tournament

|-
!colspan=9 style=| NCAA Tournament

Awards and honors
Ryan Stuart – Southland Player of the Year

References

Louisiana–Monroe Warhawks men's basketball seasons
Northeast Louisiana
Northeast Louisiana
Louisiana-Monroe Warhawks men's basketball
Louisiana-Monroe Warhawks men's basketball